The "Twangs" the "Thang" is a studio album by guitarist Duane Eddy. It was released in 1959 on Jamie Records (catalog no. JLP-70-3009). It entered Billboard magazine's pop album chart on January 25, 1960, peaked at No. 18, and remained on the chart for 13 weeks. It was one of only three Duane Eddy albums to enter the Top 20. 
It fared better in the UK, reaching No 2 in the album charts and staying in the top 10 for 12 weeks. 
AllMusic gave the album a rating of two stars.

Track listing 
All tracks composed by Duane Eddy and Lee Hazlewood; except where noted.
Side A
 "My Blue Heaven" (George A. Whiting, Walter Donaldson) - 2:31
 "Tiger Love and Turnip Greens" - 1:30
 "The Last Minute of Innocence" - 3:26
 "Route No. 1" (Duane Eddy, Corkey Casey, Jim Horn) - 1:59
 "You Are My Sunshine" (Charles Mitchell, Jimmie Davis) - 2:28
 "St. Louis Blues" (W. C. Handy) - 2:33

Side B
 "Night Train to Memphis" (Beasley Smith, Marvin Hughes, Owen Bradley) - 2:01
 "The Battle" - 1:56
 "Trambone" (Chet Atkins) - 1:37
 "Blueberry Hill" (Al Lewis, Larry Stock, Vincent Rose) - 3:27
 "Rebel Walk" - 2:13
 "Easy" (Wilson) - 3:00

Personnel
Duane Eddy and the Rebels
Duane Eddy - lead "twangy" guitar
Corkey Casey, Donnie Owens - rhythm guitar
Al Casey - bass
Larry Knechtel - piano
Jim Troxel - drums
Jim Horn - saxophone, flute
Ben Demotto - "rebel yells"
Evelyn Freeman Singers - backing vocals
Technical
Eddie Brackett, Jack Miller - sound engineer
Carl Shaw - artwork (uncredited)

References

Duane Eddy albums
1959 albums
Jamie Records albums
albums produced by Lee Hazlewood
albums produced by Lester Sill